Perryton is an unincorporated community in Licking County, in the U.S. state of Ohio.

History
A post office was established at Perryton in 1836, and remained in operation until 1905. Perryton, like Perry Township, derives its name from Commodore Oliver Hazard Perry.

References

Unincorporated communities in Licking County, Ohio
1836 establishments in Ohio
Populated places established in 1836
Unincorporated communities in Ohio